Musikalische Exequien (Funeral music), Op. 7, SWV 279–281 is a sacred composition that Heinrich Schütz wrote in 1635 or 1636. Written for the funeral services of Count Henry II, Count of Reuss-Gera, who had died on 3 December 1635, it is Schütz's most famous work of funeral music. It comprises the following sections:
I Concert in Form einer teutschen Begräbnis-Messe
II Motet Herr, wenn ich nur Dich habe
III Canticum B. Simeonis Herr, nun lässest du deinen Diener

Henry II had planned the service himself and chosen the texts, some of which are scriptural and others of which are from 16th-century Lutheran writers, including Martin Luther himself. He also commissioned Schütz to compose the music on the occasion of his death.

Part I, by far the longest part of the work, is scored for SSATTB (2 sopranos, alto, 2 tenors, bass) chorus alternating with small ensembles of soloists. Part II is scored for double choir SATB SATB, and part III for SATTB choir and a trio of soloists. All movements are accompanied by basso continuo.

The work was not well known to Brahms, though his German Requiem is remarkably similar in content.

The work was the first requiem in the German language.

Recordings
There have been many recordings, making the Exequien the most recorded work of 17th-century German vocal music. Among the recordings:
Heinrich Schütz Choir, Munich dir. Karl Richter (Archiv Produktion, 1955)
 Dresdner Kreuzchor dir. Rudolf Mauersberger (Berlin)
 Westfälische Kantorei dir. Wilhelm Ehmann (Cantate)
 Chiaroscuro dir. Hans-Martin Linde (EMI)
 Knabenchor Hannover dir. Heinz Hennig (Ars Musici)
 Vassil Kazandjiev (Forlane)
 The Schutz Academy dir. Howard Arman (Berlin)
 Chapelle Royale dir. Philippe Herreweghe (Harmonia Mundi)
 Monteverdi Choir dir. John Eliot Gardiner, (Archiv Produktion)
 Alsfelder Vokalensemble dir. Wolfgang Helbich (Naxos)
 Weser Renaissance Bremen dir. Manfred Cordes (cpo)
 Motettenchor Stuttgart dir. Günter Graulich (Carus)
 Cappella Augustana dir. Matteo Messori (Brilliant Classics)
 La Chapelle Rhénane dir. Benoît Haller (K617)
 Akadêmia dir. Françoise Lasserre with La Fenice dir. Jean Tubéry (Pierre Verany/Arion)
 American Bach Soloists dir. Jeffrey Thomas (own label)
 Vox Luminis dir. Lionel Meunier (Ricercar) - winner of Gramophone Awards 2012
 Dresdner Kammerchor dir. Hans-Christoph Rademann (Carus)
 La Petite Bande dir. Sigiswald Kuijken (Accent)
 Stuttgart Hymnus Boys Choir dir. Rainer Johannes Homburg & Musica Fiata dir. Roland Wilson (MD&G)
 The Sixteen & The Symphony of Harmony and Invention dir. Harry Christophers (CORO)
 Alsfeld Vocal Ensemble & Febi Armonici dir. Wolfgang Helbich (Naxos)
 La Chapelle Vocale of Lausanne University dir. Jean-Christophe Aubert (Gallo)

References

External links 
 Live performance by Michael Stenov with the Cantores Carmeli, 26 November 2006
 
 Musikalische Exequien: text, analysis etc. at heinrich-schuetz-haus.de
 Text

Compositions by Heinrich Schütz
1636 compositions